Szihalom is a village in Heves County, Hungary.

References

Populated places in Heves County